Kalmegha is a village in Jadbpur Union, Sakhipur Upazila, Tangail District, Dhaka Division, Bangladesh.

References

Populated places in Dhaka Division